Nicolás Jarry and Roberto Quiroz were the defending champions but chose not to defend their title.

Nicolás Mejía and Andrés Urrea won the title after defeating Ignacio Monzón and Gonzalo Villanueva 6–3, 6–4 in the final.

Seeds

Draw

References

External links
 Main draw

Open Bogotá - Doubles
2022 Doubles